Tupman is a census-designated place (CDP) in Kern County, California, United States. The population was 161 at the 2010 census, down from 227 at the 2000 census.

Geography

History
In 1920, Standard Oil Company bought the land from Hamer Irwin Tupman and founded the town. The first post office at Tupman opened in 1921.

Demographics

2010
At the 2010 census Tupman had a population of 161. The racial makeup of Tupman was 149 (92.5%) White, 0 (0.0%) African American, 0 (0.0%) Native American, 0 (0.0%) Asian, 0 (0.0%) Pacific Islander, 2 (1.2%) from other races, and 10 (6.2%) from two or more races. Hispanic or Latino of any race were 12 people (7.5%).

The whole population lived in households, no one lived in non-institutionalized group quarters and no one was institutionalized.

There were 55 households, 24 (43.6%) had children under the age of 18 living in them, 26 (47.3%) were opposite-sex married couples living together, 12 (21.8%) had a female householder with no husband present, 4 (7.3%) had a male householder with no wife present.  There were 3 (5.5%) unmarried opposite-sex partnerships, and 0 (0%) same-sex married couples or partnerships. 8 households (14.5%) were one person and 2 (3.6%) had someone living alone who was 65 or older. The average household size was 2.93.  There were 42 families (76.4% of households); the average family size was 3.29.

The age distribution was 45 people (28.0%) under the age of 18, 19 people (11.8%) aged 18 to 24, 34 people (21.1%) aged 25 to 44, 46 people (28.6%) aged 45 to 64, and 17 people (10.6%) who were 65 or older.  The median age was 32.5 years. For every 100 females, there were 106.4 males.  For every 100 females age 18 and over, there were 114.8 males.

There were 73 housing units at an average density of 138.3 per square mile, of the occupied units 34 (61.8%) were owner-occupied and 21 (38.2%) were rented. The homeowner vacancy rate was 0%; the rental vacancy rate was 12.5%.  103 people (64.0% of the population) lived in owner-occupied housing units and 58 people (36.0%) lived in rental housing units.

2000
At the 2000 census there were 227 people, 66 households, and 53 families living in the CDP. The racial makeup of the CDP was 92.95% White, 0.44% Black or African American, 0.88% Native American, 2.64% from other races, and 3.08% from two or more races.  6.17% of the population were Hispanic or Latino of any race.
Of the 66 households 37.9% had children under the age of 18 living with them, 53.0% were married couples living together, 25.8% had a female householder with no husband present, and 18.2% were non-families. 18.2% of households were one person and 3.0% were one person aged 65 or older.  The average household size was 3.44 and the average family size was 3.76.

The age distribution was 37.9% under the age of 18, 8.4% from 18 to 24, 27.8% from 25 to 44, 20.7% from 45 to 64, and 5.3% 65 or older.  The median age was 30 years. For every 100 females, there were 97.4 males.  For every 100 females age 18 and over, there were 101.4 males.

The median household income was $27,500 and the median family income  was $43,125. Males had a median income of $38,125 versus $28,750 for females. The per capita income for the CDP was $8,482.  About 12.5% of families and 20.1% of the population were below the poverty line, including 9.3% of those under the age of eighteen and 42.9% of those sixty five or over.

Notable people
 Trice Harvey, former California State Assembly member.

Photos of the area

References

Census-designated places in Kern County, California
Populated places established in 1920
Census-designated places in California